Dawn of Relic is a Finnish black metal band.

History
The band was formed by Jukka Juntunen in 1993 in Oulu, Finland. They released their first full-length album, One Night in Carcosa, in 1999, on Wicked World Records (aka Earache Records). This album had two session vocalists on it; Nazgul (ex-Horna, Satanic Warmaster) and Mika Tönning (ex-Catamenia).

The next album, Lovecraftian Dark, was not released until 2003 by their new record company Season of Mist. "Lovecraftian" in the title refers to the horror writer H. P. Lovecraft, whose writing influenced the subject matter of many of their songs. This influence is also present on One Night in Carcosa.

Their latest release was in 2005 with the album Night on Earth. Vocals on this album were performed by Kai "K.J. Khaos" Jaakkola (Deathbound, Deathchain, The Duskfall).

The drummer, Jukka Juntunen, wrote most of the songs and all of the lyrics for Dawn of Relic.

Present (2005–)
The band did not perform after November 2005 because of line-up problems. The headman Jukka Juntunen concentrated on his other band, Valucian (formed in 2002), which consists of some of the old members of Dawn of Relic.

The band became active again in 2009 to perform at the Jalometalli festival in the summer. The new line-up consists of Rami Keränen, Sampo Heikkinen (Loopwork, Dark Flood) and Ville Lind (Cryptid, Seith).

Members

Current
Rami Keränen – guitars (2009–present)
Sampo Heikkinen – keyboards (2009–present)
Ville Lind – vocals (2009–present)
Zann Path – drums (1993–2005; 2009–present), keyboards (1993–1999)

Former
Jarno Juntunen – vocals, bass guitar (1993–present)
Matti (surname unknown) – bass guitar
Pekka Malo – keyboards (1997–2002)
Pekka Mustonen – bass guitar, guitar (1994–2004)
Mika Tönning – vocals (1998–2005)
Teemu Luukinen – guitars

Discography
1999: One Night in Carcosa (Wicked World/Earache)
2003: Lovecraftian Dark (Season of Mist)
2005: Night on Earth (Season of Mist)

External links
Official website

Finnish black metal musical groups
Finnish heavy metal musical groups
Musical groups established in 1993
Earache Records artists
Season of Mist artists
Musical quartets
1993 establishments in Finland